Af Forselles is a surname, and a noble family in the Swedish and Finnish nobilities.

Notable people with the surname include:
Arthur af Forselles (1864—1953), Finnish physician and politician
Cecilia af Forselles (born 1954), the National Librarian of Finland
Jenny af Forselles (1869—1938), Finnish teacher and politician
Louise af Forselles (1850-1934), Finnish philanthropist
Sigrid af Forselles (1860—1935), Finnish sculptor
Virginia af Forselles (1759—1847), Finnish ironmaster

Finnish-language surnames
Swedish-language surnames